Julia Bertrand (1877–1960) was a French teacher, anarchist, and feminist.

Life 

Born in Gemaingoutte on 14 February 1877, Julia Bertrand taught through the early 1900s. She participated in the founding of the national teacher's union (Fédération nationale des syndicats d’instituteurs, FNSI). Bertrand wrote for the short-lived socialist and feminist journal La Femme enfranchie and the anarchist journal La Vrille. She participated in a number of pacifist, feminist, and anarchist actions, and taught at Sebastien Faure's La Ruche school. Bertrand died in Fontenay-aux-Roses on 25 March 1960.

References

Further reading 

 Michel Dreyfus, Claude Pennetier, Nathalie Viet-Depaule, La part des militants : biographie et mouvement ouvrier, Éditions de l'Atelier, 1996, page 250.
 Éliane Gubin, Le Siècle des féminismes, préface de Michelle Perrot, Éditions de l'Atelier, 2004, page 199.
 Slava Liszek, Marie Guillot, de l'émancipation des femmes à celle du syndicalisme, L'Harmattan, Paris, 1994. , page 131.
 Max Ferré, Histoire du mouvement syndicaliste révolutionnaire chez les instituteurs, des origines à 1922, Société universitaire d’éditions et de librairie, 1955.
 Roland Lewin, Sébastien Faure et la Ruche, ou l’éducation libertaire, Éditions Ivan Davy, 1989.
 Madeleine Laude, Une Femme affranchie. Gabrielle Petit, l’indomptable, Éditions du Monde libertaire, 2010.
 Florence Montreynaud, L'aventure des femmes XXe-XXIe siècle, Nathan, 2011.

1877 births
1960 deaths
French anarchists
French feminists